The Bréguet 1100 was a twin-engine French light fighter also suitable for ground-attack and built for the French armed forces. First flown in 1957, only one was completed as budget cuts led to cancellation of the programme.

Design and development
The single-engine Bréguet 1001 Taon was designed and built for a NATO fast ground-attack fighter competition. The Bréguet 1100 was a development designed instead to a French Ministère de l'Air specification, which called for two engines and a pressurised cockpit in an aircraft performing a similar role. The 1100 flew before the Taon, as the latter was delayed to incorporate the new area rule late in its construction.

The Bréguet 1100 was built entirely from bonded alloy and included many honeycomb structures. Its swept wing was about 15% greater in span and 35% greater in area than that of the Taon, though it was intended that production Taons would share the 1100's wing.  The 1100 had broad chord, short-span ailerons and narrow, long-span flaps with spoilers in front of them. The two types had similar side air intakes but the 1100's twin mid-fuselage engines and jet pipes meant that the fuselage was broader and lacked any area rule waisting, as well as being rather longer. They also shared similar swept, straight-edged tail surfaces, cockpits in the nose with narrow fairings running over the length of the upper fuselage and tricycle landing gear.

Sixteen different armament packages were available, including four 12.7 mm (0.5 in) Browning machine guns, two  DEFA cannon, 35 Matra unguided rockets or a pack of fifteen  SNEB 22 rockets.

The 1100 first flew on 31 March 1957, exceeding Mach 1. This first prototype was the only one to fly as the second was abandoned when 80% complete and an ordered third prototype, a navalized version designated 1100M, was not begun. Before mid-1959 the Bréguet 1100 programme had been cancelled due to government spending cuts.

Variants
Bréguet 1100 First two prototypes, second unfinished.
Bréguet 1100M Navalized third prototype: not built.

Specifications (1100)

References

Bibliography

External links
Aviafrance Bre.1100 page

1950s French fighter aircraft
 1100